Honeymoon is a 1973 Bollywood comedy film, is a Rajshri Productions film, directed by Hiren Nag. The film stars Leena Chandavarkar and Anil Dhawan .

Plot
Two close friends, Neelu and Madhu, agree that men cannot be trusted, and as such decide to dump their current boyfriends, and marry someone else who meets with the approval of their parents. Shortly thereafter, Madhu is introduced to Chandrakant, whom she likes, and soon both are married. On their honeymoon, she meets with Neelu, who has married Deepak, also her parents' choice. Both are delighted to see other, and cannot wait to meet the others' spouse, little realizing the shock they will get when they do so.

Music

Cast
Anil Dhawan as Chandrakant
Leena Chandavarkar as Madhu
Nazima as Neelima "Neelu"
Suresh Chatwal as Deepak
Utpal Dutt as Advocate Neeraj Chaudhary
Shyama as Laxmi Chaudhary
Mukri as Ram Singh
Sunder as Madhu's Uncle
Leela Mishra as Madhu's Aunty
Jalal Agha
Purnima as Madhu's Mother
Agha as Ramakant
Ruby Mayer as Mrs. Patterson
Shammi as Mrs. Ramakant

References

External links
 

1973 films
1970s Hindi-language films
1973 comedy films
Rajshri Productions films
Films scored by Usha Khanna
Films directed by Hiren Nag